Oskar Xavier Schlömilch (13 April 1823 – 7 February 1901) was a German mathematician, born in Weimar, working in mathematical analysis. He took a doctorate at the University of Jena in 1842, and became a professor at Dresden Polytechnic in 1849.

He is now known as the eponym of the Schlömilch function, a kind of Bessel function. He was also an important textbook writer, and editor of the journal  Zeitschrift für Mathematik und Physik, of which he was a founder in 1856. He published in 1868 for the first time the dissection paradox, earlier invented by Sam Loyd.

In 1862, he was elected a foreign member of the Royal Swedish Academy of Sciences.

See also
Cauchy–Schlömilch transformation
Schlömilch's series
Schlömilch Generalization
Paradox of Loyd and Schlömilch

References

External links

20th-century German mathematicians
Members of the Royal Swedish Academy of Sciences
1823 births
1901 deaths